Barkhan is an administrative subdivision, (tehsil) of Barkhan District in the Balochistan province of Pakistan. It is administratively subdivided into 8 Union Councils.

References 

Barkhan District
Tehsils of Balochistan, Pakistan